Grigory Yaroslavtsev is a Russian-American computer scientist. He is an assistant professor of computer science at George Mason University. Previously he was an assistant professor of computer science at Indiana University and the founding director of the Center for Algorithms and Machine Learning (CAML) at Indiana University.

Early education and competitive programing 
Yaroslavtsev was born in St. Petersburg, then Leningrad, in 1987. He attended the St. Petersburg Classical Gymnasium through 9th grade. In 2004, Yaroslavtsev graduated from the Physics and Technology School in St. Petersburg, a high school founded by Zhores Alferov. Yaroslavtsev completed a B.S. in applied physics at St. Petersburg Polytechnic University in 2008. In 2010, he received his M.S. from St. Petersburg Academic University as the first student in a pilot theoretical computer science program.

Yaroslavtsev was active through 2011 in international programming competitions. He was one of 24 world finalists in algorithms in the 2010 TopCoder Open competition and is a member of the TCO hall of fame. Yaroslavtsev also coached the high school team of the Physics and Technology School in 2009, when the team placed first in St. Petersburg.

Career 
Yaroslavtsev completed his PhD in computer science in three years in 2013 at Pennsylvania State University, advised by Sofya Raskhodnikova. His dissertation was titled Efficient Combinatorial Techniques in Sparsification, Summarization and Testing of Large Datasets. After an ICERM institute postdoctoral fellowship at Brown University, he joined the University of Pennsylvania in the first cohort of fellows at the Warren Center for Network and Data Science, founded by Michael Kearns.

In 2016, Yaroslavtsev joined the faculty at Indiana University in the Department of Computer Science and founded the Center for Algorithms and Machine Learning (CAML) at Indiana University. He held a secondary appointment in the Department of Statistics at Indiana University. Yaroslavtsev held a visiting position at the Alan Turing Institute in 2019. In 2021, Yaroslavtsev joined the faculty at George Mason University in the Department of Computer Science.

Yaroslavtsev is best known for his work on massively parallel computing and algorithms for big data, clustering analysis including correlation clustering, and privacy in network analysis and targeted search.

References

External links
 
 

1987 births
Living people
Russian computer scientists
Peter the Great St. Petersburg Polytechnic University alumni
Pennsylvania State University alumni
Competitive programmers